Pompeii was an ancient city located in what is now the comune of Pompei near Naples in the Campania region of Italy. Pompeii, along with Herculaneum and many villas in the surrounding area (e.g. at Boscoreale, Stabiae), was buried under  of volcanic ash and pumice in the Eruption of Mount Vesuvius in 79 AD.

Largely preserved under the ash, the excavated city offers a unique snapshot of Roman life, frozen at the moment it was buried, although much of the detailed evidence of the everyday life of its inhabitants was lost in the excavations. It was a wealthy town, with a population of ca. 11,000 in AD 79, enjoying many fine public buildings and luxurious private houses with lavish decorations, furnishings and works of art which were the main attractions for the early excavators. Organic remains, including wooden objects and human bodies, were interred in the ash. Over time, they decayed, leaving voids that archaeologists found could be used as moulds to make plaster casts of unique, and often gruesome, figures in their final moments of life. The numerous graffiti carved on the walls and inside rooms provide a wealth of examples of the largely lost Vulgar Latin spoken colloquially at the time, contrasting with the formal language of the classical writers.

Pompeii is a UNESCO World Heritage Site and is one of the most popular tourist attractions in Italy, with approximately 2.5 million visitors annually.

After many excavations prior to 1960 that had uncovered most of the city but left it in decay, further major excavations were banned or limited to targeted, prioritised areas. In 2018, these led to new discoveries in some previously unexplored areas of the city.

Name 
Pompeii in Latin is a second declension masculine plural noun (Pompeiī, -ōrum). According to Theodor Kraus, "The root of the word Pompeii would appear to be the Oscan word for the number five, pompe, which suggests that either the community consisted of five hamlets or perhaps it was settled by a family group (gens Pompeia)."

Geography 

The plateau fell steeply to the south and partly to the west into the sea. Three layers of sediment from large landslides lie on top of the lava, perhaps triggered by extended rainfall. The mouth of the navigable Sarno River, adjacent to the city, was protected by lagoons and served early Greek and Phoenician sailors as a haven port, later developed by the Romans.

History 

Although best known for its Roman remains visible today, dating from AD 79, it was built upon a substantial city dating from much earlier times. Expansion of the city from an early nucleus (the old town) accelerated after 450 BC under the Greeks following the battle of Cumae.

Early history 

The first stable settlements on the site date to the 8th century BC when the Oscans, a population of central Italy, founded five villages in the area.

With the arrival of the Greeks in Campania from around 740 BC, Pompeii entered the orbit of the Hellenic people. The most important building of this period is the Doric Temple, built away from the centre in what would later become the Triangular Forum. At the same time the cult of Apollo was introduced. Greek and Phoenician sailors used the location as a safe port.

In the early 6th century BC, the settlement merged into a single community centred on the important crossroad between Cumae, Nola, and Stabiae and was surrounded by a tufa city wall (the pappamonte wall). The first wall (which was also used as a base for the later wall) unusually enclosed a much greater area than the early town together with much agricultural land. That such an impressive wall was built at this time indicates that the settlement was already important and wealthy. The city began to flourish and maritime trade started with the construction of a small port near the mouth of the river. The earliest settlement was focused in regions VII and VIII of the town (the old town) as identified from stratigraphy below the Samnite and Roman buildings, as well as from the different and irregular street plan.

By 524 BC the Etruscans had settled in the area, including Pompeii, finding in the river Sarno a communication route between the sea and the interior. Like the Greeks, the Etruscans did not conquer the city militarily, but simply controlled it, and Pompeii enjoyed a sort of autonomy. Nevertheless, Pompeii became a member of the Etruscan League of cities. Excavations in 1980–1981 have shown the presence of Etruscan inscriptions and a 6th-century BC necropolis. Under the Etruscans, a primitive forum or simple market square was built, as well as the Temple of Apollo, in both of which objects including fragments of bucchero were found by Maiuri. Several houses were built with the so-called Tuscan atrium, typical of this people.

 

In 474 BC, the Greek city of Cumae, allied with Syracuse, defeated the Etruscans at the Battle of Cumae and gained control of the area.

The Samnite period

The period between about 450–375 BC witnessed large areas of the city being abandoned while important sanctuaries such as the Temple of Apollo show a sudden lack of votive material remains.

The Samnites, people from the areas of Abruzzo and Molise, and allies of the Romans, conquered Greek Cumae between 423 and 420 BC. It is likely that all of the surrounding territory, including Pompeii, was already conquered around 424 BC. The new rulers gradually imposed their architecture and enlarged the town.

From 343 to 341 BC in the Samnite Wars, the first Roman army entered the Campanian plain bringing with it the customs and traditions of Rome, and in the Roman Latin War from 340 BC, the Samnites were faithful to Rome. Although governed by the Samnites, Pompeii entered the Roman orbit, to which it remained faithful even during the third Samnite war and in the war against Pyrrhus. In the late 4th century BC, the city began expanding from its nucleus into the open-walled area. The street plan of the new areas was more regular and more conformal to Hippodamus's street plan. The city walls were reinforced in Sarno stone in the early 3rd century BC (the limestone enceinte, or the "first Samnite wall"). It formed the basis for the currently visible walls with an outer wall of rectangular limestone blocks as a terrace wall supporting a large agger, or earth embankment, behind it.

After the Samnite Wars from 290 BC, Pompeii was forced to accept the status of socii of Rome, maintaining, however, linguistic and administrative autonomy.

From the outbreak of the Second Punic War (218–201 BC) in which Hannibal's invasion threatened many cities, Pompeii remained faithful to Rome unlike many of the southern cities. As a result, an additional internal wall was built of tufa and the internal agger and outer façade raised, resulting in a double parapet with a wider wall-walk. Despite the political uncertainty of these events and the progressive migration of wealthy men to quieter cities in the eastern Mediterranean, Pompeii continued to flourish due to the production and trade of wine and oil with places like Provence and Spain, as well as to intensive agriculture on farms around the city.

In the 2nd century BC, Pompeii enriched itself by taking part in Rome's conquest of the east, as shown by a statue of Apollo in the Forum erected by Lucius Mummius in gratitude for their support in the sack of Corinth and the eastern campaigns. These riches enabled Pompeii to bloom and expand to its ultimate limits. The Forum and many public and private buildings of high architectural quality were built, including The Large Theatre, the Temple of Jupiter, the Basilica, the Comitium, the Stabian Baths, and a new two-story portico.

The Roman period

Pompeii was one of the towns of Campania that rebelled against Rome in the Social Wars and in 89 BC it was besieged by Sulla, who targeted the strategically vulnerable Porta Ercolano with his artillery as can still be seen by the impact craters of thousands of ballista shots in the walls. Many nearby buildings inside the walls were also destroyed. Although the battle-hardened troops of the Social League, headed by Lucius Cluentius, helped in resisting the Romans, Pompeii was forced to surrender after the conquest of Nola. The result was that Pompeii became a Roman colony named Colonia Cornelia Veneria Pompeianorum. Many of Sulla's veterans were given land and property in and around the city, while many who opposed Rome were dispossessed of their property. Despite this, the Pompeians were granted Roman citizenship and quickly assimilated into the Roman world. The main language in the city became Latin, and many of Pompeii's old aristocratic families Latinized their names as a sign of assimilation.

The area around Pompeii became very prosperous due to the desirability of living on the Bay of Naples for wealthy Romans and due to the rich agricultural land. Many farms and villas were built nearby, outside the city and many have been excavated. These include the Villa of the Mysteries, Villa of Diomedes, several at Boscoreale, Boscotrecase, Oplontis, Terzigno, and Civita Guiliana.

The city became an important passage for goods that arrived by sea and had to be sent toward Rome or Southern Italy along the nearby Appian Way. Many public buildings were constructed or refurbished and improved under the new order; new buildings included the Amphitheatre of Pompeii in 70 BC, the Forum Baths, and the Odeon. In comparison, the Forum was embellished with the colonnade of Popidius before 80 BC. These buildings raised the status of Pompeii as a cultural centre in the region as it outshone its neighbours in the number of places for entertainment which significantly enhanced the social and economic development of the city.

Under Augustus, from about 30 BC, a major expansion in new public buildings, as in the rest of the empire, included the Eumachia Building, the Sanctuary of Augustus and the Macellum. From about 20 BC, Pompeii was fed with running water by a spur from the Serino Aqueduct, built by Marcus Vipsanius Agrippa.

In AD 59, there was a serious riot and bloodshed in the amphitheatre between Pompeians and Nucerians (which is recorded in a fresco) and which led the Roman Senate to send the Praetorian Guard to restore order and to ban further events for ten years.

AD 62–79 
The inhabitants of Pompeii had long been used to minor earthquakes (indeed, the writer Pliny the Younger wrote that earth tremors "were not particularly alarming because they are frequent in Campania"), but on 5 February 62 a severe earthquake did considerable damage around the bay, and particularly to Pompeii. It is believed that the earthquake would have registered between 5 and 6 on the Richter magnitude scale.

On that day in Pompeii, there were to be two sacrifices, as it was the anniversary of Augustus being named Pater Patriae ("Father of the Country") and also a feast day to honour the guardian spirits of the city. Chaos followed the earthquake; fires caused by oil lamps that had fallen during the quake added to the panic. The nearby cities of Herculaneum and Nuceria were also affected.

Between 62 AD and the eruption in 79 AD, most rebuilding was done in the private sector and older, damaged frescoes were often covered with newer ones, for example. In the public sector, the opportunity was taken to improve buildings and the city plan, e.g. in the Forum.

An important field of current research concerns structures that were restored between the earthquake of 62 and the eruption. It was thought until recently that some of the damage had still not been repaired at the time of the eruption, but this is doubtful as the evidence of missing forum statues and marble wall veneers are most likely due to robbers after the city's burial. The public buildings on the east side of the Forum were largely restored and were enhanced by beautiful marble veneers and other modifications to the architecture.

Some buildings like the Central Baths were only started after the earthquake and were built to enhance the city with modern developments in their architecture, as had been done in Rome, in terms of wall-heating and window glass, and with well-lit spacious rooms. The new baths took over a whole insula by demolishing houses, which may have been made easier by the earthquake that had damaged these houses. This shows that the city was still flourishing rather than struggling to recover from the earthquake.

In about 64, Nero and his wife Poppaea visited Pompeii and made gifts to the temple of Venus (the city's patron deity), probably when he performed in the theatre of Naples.

By 79, Pompeii had a population of 20,000, which had prospered from the region's renowned agricultural fertility and favourable location, although more recent estimates are up to 11,500 based on household counts.

Eruption of Vesuvius 

The eruption lasted for two days. The first phase was of pumice rain (lapilli) lasting about 18 hours, allowing most inhabitants to escape. Only approximately 1,150 bodies have so far been found on site, which seems to confirm this theory, and most escapees probably managed to salvage some of their most valuable belongings; many skeletons were found with jewellery, coins, and silverware.

At some time in the night or early the next day, pyroclastic flows began near the volcano, consisting of high speed, dense, and scorching ash clouds, knocking down wholly or partly all structures in their path, incinerating or suffocating the remaining population and altering the landscape, including the coastline. By the evening of the second day, the eruption was over, leaving only haze in the atmosphere through which the sun shone weakly.

A multidisciplinary volcanological and bio-anthropological study of the eruption products and victims, merged with numerical simulations and experiments, indicates that at Pompeii and surrounding towns heat was the main cause of death of people, previously believed to have died by ash suffocation.

Pliny the Younger provided a first-hand account of the eruption of Mount Vesuvius from his position across the Bay of Naples at Misenum, but it was written 25 years after the event. His uncle, Pliny the Elder, with whom he had a close relationship, died while attempting to rescue stranded victims. As admiral of the fleet, Pliny the Elder had ordered the ships of the Imperial Navy stationed at Misenum to cross the bay to assist evacuation attempts. Volcanologists have recognised the importance of Pliny the Younger's account of the eruption by calling similar events "Plinian". It had long been thought that the eruption was an August event based on one version of the letter, but another version gives a date of the eruption as late as 23 November. A later date is consistent with a charcoal inscription at the site, discovered in 2018, which includes the date of 17 October and which must have been recently written. A collaborative study in 2022 determined a date of 24–25 October.

An October/November eruption is clearly supported by many pieces of evidence: the fact that people buried in the ash appear to have been wearing heavier clothing than the light summer clothes typical of August; the fresh fruit and vegetables in the shops are typical of Octoberand conversely the summer fruit typical of August was already being sold in dried, or conserved form; nuts from chestnut trees were found at Oplontis, which would not have been mature before mid-September; wine fermenting jars had been sealed, which would have happened around the end of October; coins found in the purse of a woman buried in the ash include one with a 15th imperatorial acclamation among the emperor's titles. These coins could not have been minted before the second week of September.

Rediscovery and excavations

Titus appointed two ex-consuls to organise a relief effort while donating large amounts of money from the imperial treasury to aid the victims of the volcano. He visited Pompeii once after the eruption and again the following year but no work was done on recovery.

Soon after the city's burial, survivors and possibly thieves came to salvage valuables, including the marble statues from the Forum and other precious materials from buildings. There is wide evidence of post-eruption disturbance, including holes made through walls. The city was not completely buried, and the tops of larger buildings would have been visible above the ash, making it obvious where to dig or salvage building material. The robbers left traces of their passage, as in a house where modern archaeologists found a wall graffito saying "house dug".

Over the following centuries, its name and location were forgotten, though it still appeared on the Tabula Peutingeriana of the 4th century. Further eruptions, particularly in 471–473 and 512, covered the remains more deeply. The area became known as the La Civita (the city) due to the features in the ground.

The next known date that any part was unearthed was in 1592, when architect Domenico Fontana, while digging an underground aqueduct to the mills of Torre Annunziata, ran into ancient walls covered with paintings and inscriptions. His aqueduct passed through and underneath a large part of the city and would have had to pass through many buildings and foundations, as they still can be seen in many places today. However, he kept the finding secret.

In 1689, Francesco Picchetti saw a wall inscription mentioning decurio Pompeiis ("town councillor of Pompeii"), but he associated it with a villa of Pompey. Francesco Bianchini pointed out the true meaning, and he was supported by Giuseppe Macrini, who in 1693 excavated some walls and wrote that Pompeii lay beneath La Civita.

Herculaneum was rediscovered in 1738 by workers digging for the foundations of a summer palace for the King of Naples, Charles of Bourbon. Due to the spectacular quality of the finds, the Spanish military engineer Roque Joaquín de Alcubierre made excavations to find further remains at the site of Pompeii in 1748, even if the city was not identified. Charles of Bourbon took great interest in the finds, even after leaving to become king of Spain because the display of antiquities reinforced Naples' political and cultural prestige. On 20 August 1763, an inscription [...] Rei Publicae Pompeianorum [...] was found and the city was identified as Pompeii.

Karl Weber directed the first scientific excavations. He was followed in 1764 by military engineer Franscisco la Vega, who was succeeded by his brother, Pietro, in 1804.

There was much progress in exploration when the French occupied Naples in 1799 and ruled over Italy from 1806 to 1815. The land on which Pompeii lies was confiscated, and up to 700 workers were employed in the excavations. The excavated areas in the north and south were connected. Parts of the Via dell'Abbondanza were also exposed in the west-east direction, and for the first time, an impression of the size and appearance of the ancient town could be appreciated. In the following years, the excavators struggled with a lack of money. Excavations progressed slowly, but with significant finds such as the houses of the Faun, of Menandro, of the Tragic Poet and the Surgeon.

Giuseppe Fiorelli took charge of the excavations in 1863 and made greater progress. During early excavations of the site, occasional voids in the ash layer had been found that contained human remains. Fiorelli realised these were spaces left by the decomposed bodies, and so devised the technique of injecting plaster into them to recreate the forms of Vesuvius's victims. This technique is still in use today, with a clear resin now used instead of plaster because it is more durable and does not destroy the bones, allowing further analysis.

Fiorelli also introduced scientific documentation. He divided the city into today's nine areas (regiones) and blocks (insulae) and numbered the entrances of the individual houses (domus). Fiorelli also published the first periodical with excavation reports. Under his successors, the entire west section of the city was exposed.

Modern archaeology

After those of Fiorelli, excavations continued in an increasingly more systematic and considered manner under several directors of archaeology though still with the main interest in making spectacular discoveries and uncovering more houses rather than answering the main questions about the city and its long term preservation.

In the 1920s, Amedeo Maiuri excavated older layers beneath those of 79 AD for the first time to learn about the settlement history. Maiuri made the last excavations on a grand scale in the 1950s, and the area south of the Via dell'Abbondanza and the city wall was almost completely uncovered, but they were poorly documented scientifically. Preservation was haphazard, and his reconstructions were difficult to distinguish from the original ruins, which is a great handicap for studying genuine antique remains. Questionable reconstruction was also done after the severe earthquake of 1980, which caused great destruction. Since then, work has been confined to the excavated areas except for targeted soundings and excavations. Further excavations on a large scale are not planned, and today archaeologists are more engaged in reconstructing, documenting and slowing the decay of the ruins.

In December 2018, archaeologists discovered the remains of harnessed horses in the Villa of the Mysteries.

These excavations resumed on unexcavated areas of Regio V. In November 2020 the remains of two men, thought to be a rich man and his slave, were found in a  layer of ash. They appeared to have escaped the first eruption but were killed by a second blast the next day. A study of the bones showed that the younger one appeared to have done manual labour and hence was likely a slave.

In December 2020, a thermopolium, an inn or snack-bar, was excavated in Regio V. In addition to brightly coloured frescoes depicting some of the food on offer, archaeologists found eight dolia (terracotta pots) still containing remnants of meals, including duck, goat, pig, fish, and snails. They also found a decorated bronze drinking bowl known as a patera, wine flasks, amphora, and ceramic jars used for cooking stews and soups. One fresco depicts a dog with a collar on a leash, possibly reminding customers to leash their pets.

In January 2021 a well-preserved "large, four-wheel ceremonial chariot" was uncovered by archaeologists headed by Massimo Osanna at a villa in Civita Giuliana, north of Pompeii, where a stable had previously been discovered in 2018. The carriage is made of bronze and black and red wooden panels, with engraved metal medallions at the back.

In 2021 an exceptional 1st century AD painted tomb of a freed-slave, Marcus Venerius Secundio, containing mummified human remains, was discovered outside the Porta Sarno gate. Its inscription records he achieved custodianship of the Temple of Venus and membership of the Augustales, priests of the Imperial Cult. Also, he organised Greek and Latin performances lasting four days, the first evidence of Greek cultural events in Pompeii.

Conservation 

Objects buried beneath Pompeii were well-preserved for almost 2,000 years as the lack of air and moisture allowed little to no deterioration. However, Pompeii has been exposed to natural and anthropic deterioration following excavation.

Weathering, erosion, light exposure, water damage, poor methods of excavation and reconstruction, introduced plants and animals, tourism, vandalism and theft have all damaged the site in some way. The lack of adequate weather protection for all but the most interesting and important buildings has allowed original interior decoration to fade or be lost. Two-thirds of the city has been excavated, but the remnants of the city are rapidly deteriorating.

Furthermore, during World War II many buildings were badly damaged or destroyed by bombs dropped in several raids by the Allied forces.

The conservation concern has constantly worried archaeologists. The ancient city was included in the 1996 World Monuments Watch by the World Monuments Fund, and again in 1998 and in 2000. In 1996 the organisation claimed that Pompeii "desperately need[ed] repair" and called for the drafting of a general plan of restoration and interpretation. The organisation supported conservation at Pompeii with funding from American Express and the Samuel H. Kress Foundation.

The Schola Armatorum ('House of the Gladiators') collapsed in 2010 caused by heavy rainfall and lack of proper drainage. The structure was not open to visitors, but the outside was visible to tourists. There was fierce controversy after the collapse, with accusations of neglect.

Today, funding is mostly directed into conservation of the site; however, due to the expanse of Pompeii and the scale of the problems, this is inadequate in halting the slow decay of the materials. A 2012 study recommended an improved strategy for interpretation and presentation of the site as a cost-effective method of improving its conservation and preservation in the short term.

In June 2013, UNESCO warned that if restoration and preservation works "fail to deliver substantial progress in the next two years," Pompeii could be placed on the List of World Heritage in Danger. A "Grande Progetto Pompei" project of about five years had begun in 2012 with the European Union and included stabilization and conservation of buildings in the highest risk areas. In 2014, UNESCO headquarters received a new management plan to help integrate the property's management, conservation, and maintenance programs.

In 2020 many domus gardens, orchards and vineyards were carefully recreated using depictions in frescoes and archaeological finds to give better insights into what they were like before the catastrophe. These include the House of Julia Felix, the House of the Golden Cupids, the House of Loreius Tiburtinus, the House of Cornelius Rufus and the Garden of the Fugitives.

In 2021 several long-closed domus were re-opened after restoration including the House of the Ship Europa, House of the Orchard and House of the Lovers. Also the newly excavated House of Leda and the Swan has opened.

Roman city development 

Owing to its wealth and its Greek, Etruscan and Roman history, Pompeii is of great interest for the study of Ancient Roman architecture in terms of building methods and urban planning. However, it was a relatively small provincial city and, except for the Amphitheatre, it did not have large monuments on the scale of other Roman cities. It also missed the large building schemes of the early Empire and kept much of its urban architecture dating from as early as the 4th century BC.

The evolution of Pompeii's private and public buildings is often unclear because of the lack of excavations beneath the levels of 79. It is, however, clear that by the time of the conquest by Sulla in 89 BC, the development of the street layout was largely complete, and most of the insulae were built.

Public buildings

Under the Romans, Pompeii underwent a process of urban development which accelerated in the Augustan period from about 30 BC. New public buildings included the Amphitheatre with palaestra or gymnasium with a central natatorium (cella natatoria) or swimming pool, two theatres, the Eumachia Building and at least four public baths. The amphitheatre has been cited by scholars as a model of sophisticated design, particularly in the area of crowd control.

Other service buildings were the Macellum ("meat market"); the Pistrinum (baker); the thermopolia (inns or snack-bars that served hot and cold dishes and drinks), and cauponae ("pubs" or "dives" with a seedy reputation as hangouts for thieves and prostitutes). At least one building, the Lupanar, was dedicated to prostitution. A large hotel or hospitium (of 1,000 m2) was found at Murecine, a short distance from Pompeii, when the Naples-Salerno motorway was being built, and the Murecine Silver Treasure and the Tablets (providing a unique record of business transactions) were discovered there.

An aqueduct provided water to the public baths, to more than 25 street fountains, and to many private houses and businesses. The aqueduct was a branch of the great Serino Aqueduct built to serve the other large towns in the Bay of Naples region and the important naval base at Misenum. The castellum aquae is well preserved and includes many details of the distribution network and its controls.

Shops and workshops

There were at least 31 bakeries in the town, each with wood-burning ovens, millstones and a sales counter. The Modestus bakery, or House of the Oven, was the largest in the city and Sotericus's bakery, also among the largest, preserves the room for kneading bread.

Thermopolia were inns or snack-bars in which hot food and drinks were sold and in Pompeii there were nearly 100. The thermopolium of Vetutius Placidus overlooked the street directly, had a counter and several dolia, as well as a room behind the shop where customers could eat their meals: the lararium with frescoes of the Lares and Mercury and Dionysus and a triclinium decorated in the Third style. In the thermopolium of Asellina, with three sales counters and a lararium with depictions of Mercury and Bacchus, numerous furnishings have been found, both in bronze and terracotta, as well as 683 sesterces; the external façade bears a representation of jugs and funnels and an electoral inscription referring to Asellina, probably the owner of the inn.

Wool processing was well developed with 13 workshops that worked the raw material, seven that did the spinning, nine the dyeing, and 18 the washing: the Building of Eumachia, from the name of the priestess who built it, was the wool market, or the seat of the fullers guild; construction took place after 62 and was entirely in brickwork. Inside it has numerous niches in which statues were housed, mostly concerning the imperial family, a colonnade, and near the entrance, there was a jar in which urine was collected for use as a detergent for clothes. The fullonica of Stephanus, named after the owner or manager, was originally a house that was transformed into a workshop for the processing of fabrics: on the lower floor the working and washing activities took place, carried out in large tanks with water, soda and urine while on the upper floor the clothes were dried.

The garum workshop made the sauce obtained from the fermentation of the entrails of fish; in the building some containers were found, closed by lids, with the sauce inside while in the nearby garden was a large deposit of amphorae.

Lists of buildings

Agriculture and horticulture

Modern archaeologists have excavated garden sites and urban domains to reveal the agricultural staples of Pompeii's economy. Pompeii had fertile soil for crop cultivation. The soils surrounding Mount Vesuvius preceding its eruption had good water-retention capabilities, implying productive agriculture. The Tyrrhenian Sea's airflow provided hydration to the soil despite the hot, dry climate. Barley, wheat, and millet were produced along with wine and olive oil, for export to other regions.

Evidence of wine imported nationally from Pompeii in its most prosperous years can be found from recovered artefacts such as wine bottles in Rome. For this reason, vineyards were of utmost importance to Pompeii's economy. Agricultural policymaker Columella suggested that each vineyard in Rome produce a quota of three cullei of wine per jugerum; otherwise, the vineyard would be uprooted. The nutrient-rich lands near Pompeii were extremely efficient and often capable of largely exceeding these requirements, providing the incentive for local wineries to establish themselves. While wine was exported for Pompeii's economy, most other agricultural goods were likely produced in quantities sufficient for the city's consumption.

Remains of large formations of constructed wineries were found in the Forum Boarium, covered by cemented casts from the eruption of Vesuvius. It is speculated that these historical vineyards are strikingly similar in structure to the modern day vineyards across Italy.

Carbonised food plant remains, roots, seeds and pollens have been found in gardens in Pompeii, Herculaneum, and a Roman villa at Torre Annunziata. They revealed that emmer wheat, Italian millet, common millet, walnuts, pine nuts, chestnuts, hazel nuts, chickpeas, bitter vetch, broad beans, olives, figs, pears, onions, garlic, peaches, carob, grapes, and dates were consumed. All but the dates could have been produced locally.

Erotic art

The discovery of erotic art in Pompeii and Herculaneum left the archaeologists with a dilemma stemming from the clash of cultures between the mores of sexuality in ancient Rome and in Counter-Reformation Europe. An unknown number of discoveries were hidden away again. A wall fresco depicting Priapus, the ancient god of sex and fertility, with his grotesquely enlarged penis, was covered with plaster. An older reproduction was locked away "out of prudishness" and opened only on request – and only rediscovered in 1998 due to rainfall. In 2018, an ancient fresco depicting an erotic scene of "Leda and the Swan" was discovered at Pompeii.

Many artefacts from the buried cities are preserved in the Naples National Archaeological Museum. In 1819, when King Francis visited the Pompeii exhibition there with his wife and daughter, he was so embarrassed by the erotic artwork that he had it locked away in a "secret cabinet" (gabinetto segreto), a gallery within the museum accessible only to "people of mature age and respected morals". Re-opened, closed, re-opened again and then closed again for nearly 100 years, the Naples "Secret Museum" was briefly made accessible again at the end of the 1960s (the time of the sexual revolution) and was finally re-opened for viewing in 2000. Minors are still allowed entry only in the presence of a guardian or with written permission.

Tourism 

Pompeii has been a popular tourist destination for over 250 years; it was on the Grand Tour. By 2008, it was attracting almost 2.6 million visitors per year, making it one of Italy's most popular tourist sites. It is part of a larger Vesuvius National Park and was declared a World Heritage Site by UNESCO in 1997. To combat problems associated with tourism, the governing body for Pompeii, the 'Soprintendenza Archeologica di Pompei', has begun issuing new tickets that allow tourists to visit cities such as Herculaneum and Stabiae as well as the Villa Poppaea, to encourage visitors to see these sites and reduce pressure on Pompeii.

Pompeii is a driving force behind the economy of the nearby town of Pompei. Many residents are employed in the tourism and hospitality industry, serving as taxi or bus drivers, waiters, or hotel staff.

Excavations at the site have generally ceased due to a moratorium imposed by the superintendent of the site, Professor Pietro Giovanni Guzzo. The site is generally less accessible to tourists than in the past, with less than a third of all buildings open in the 1960s available for public viewing today.

Antiquarium of Pompeii
Originally built by Giuseppe Fiorelli between 1873 and 1874, the Antiquarium of Pompeii began as an exhibition venue displaying archaeological finds that represented the daily life of the ancient city. The building suffered extensive damage in 1943 during the World War II bombings and again in 1980 due to an earthquake. The museum was closed to the public for 36 years before reopening in 2016 as a space for temporary exhibitions. The museum was re-opened on 25 January 2021 as a permanent exhibition venue. Visitors can see archaeological discoveries from the excavations, casts of the victims of the Mount Vesuvius eruption as well as displays documenting Pompeii's settlement history before becoming a thriving Roman city.

In popular culture 

The 1954 film Journey to Italy, starring George Sanders and Ingrid Bergman, includes a scene at Pompeii in which they witness the excavation of a cast of a couple who perished in the eruption.

Pompeii was the setting for the British comedy television series Up Pompeii! and the movie of the series. Pompeii also featured in the second episode of the fourth season of revived BBC science fiction series Doctor Who, named "The Fires of Pompeii", which featured Caecilius as a character.

The rock band Pink Floyd filmed a 1971 live concert, Pink Floyd: Live at Pompeii, in which they performed six songs in the city's ancient Roman amphitheatre. The audience consisted only of the film's production crew and some local children.

Siouxsie and the Banshees wrote and recorded the punk-inflected dance song "Cities in Dust", which describes the disaster that befell Pompeii and Herculaneum in AD 79. The song appears on their album 1985 Tinderbox. The jacket of the single remix of the song features the plaster cast of a chained dog killed in Pompeii.

Pompeii is a 2003 Robert Harris novel featuring an account of the aquarius's race to fix the broken aqueduct in the days before the eruption of Vesuvius. Actual events and people inspired the novel.

"Pompeii" is a 2013 song by the British band Bastille. The lyrics refer to the city and the eruption of Mount Vesuvius.

Pompeii is a 2014 German-Canadian historical disaster film produced and directed by Paul W. S. Anderson.

45 years after the Pink Floyd recordings, guitarist David Gilmour returned to the Pompeii amphitheatre in 2016 to perform a live concert for his Rattle That Lock Tour. This event was considered the first in the amphitheatre to feature an audience since the AD 79 eruption of Vesuvius.

Documentaries 
 In Search of...s episode No. 82 focuses entirely on Pompeii; it premiered on 29 November 1979.
 The National Geographic special In the Shadow of Vesuvius (1987) explores the sites of Pompeii and Herculaneum, interviews (then) leading archaeologists, and examines the events leading up to the eruption of Vesuvius.
 Ancient Mysteries: Pompeii: Buried Alive (1996), an A&E television documentary narrated by Leonard Nimoy.
 Pompeii: The Last Day (2003), an hour-long drama produced for the BBC that portrays several characters (with historically attested names, but fictional life-stories) living in Pompeii, Herculaneum and around the Bay of Naples, and their last hours, including a fuller and his wife, two gladiators, and Pliny the Elder. It also portrays the facts of the eruption.
 Pompeii and the AD 79 eruption (2004), a two-hour Tokyo Broadcasting System documentary.
 Pompeii Live (28 June 2006), a Channel 5 production featuring a live archaeological dig at Pompeii and Herculaneum.
 Pompeii: The Mystery of the People Frozen in Time (2013), a BBC One drama documentary presented by Dr. Margaret Mountford.
 The Riddle of Pompeii (23 May 2014), Discovery Channel.
 Pompeii: The Dead Speak (8 August 2016), Smithsonian Channel.
 Pompeii's People (3 September 2017), a CBC Gem documentary presented by David Suzuki.

Gallery

See also 

 Foreign influences on Pompeii
 Mastroberardino, a project with the Italian winery Mastroberardino to replant the vineyards of Pompeii
 Robert Rive, 1850s photographer of Pompeii
 Luigi Bazzani: Watercolours of Pompeii when first excavated

 Volcanic destruction
 Armero tragedy, a city in Colombia that suffered a similar fate in 1985
 Akrotiri, in Santorini, Greece, excavated ruins of a city that suffered a similar fate to Pompeii more than 3000 years ago
 Joya de Cerén, a pre-Columbian farming village in El Salvador known as the "Pompeii of the Americas"
 Plymouth, Montserrat, former capital city buried by volcanic ash from the Soufrière Hills volcano in the 1990s
 Saint-Pierre, Martinique, town similarly destroyed by the volcanic eruption of Mount Pelee, in 1902

References

Further reading 

 
 
 
 
 
 *

External links 

 
 
 Data on new excavations from the International Association for Classical Archaeology (AIAC)
 World History Encyclopedia – Pompeii
 Archaeological Park of Pompeii on Google Arts and Culture platform
 Forum of Pompeii Digital Media Archive (creative commons-licensed photos, laser scans, panoramas), data from a University of Ferrara/CyArk research partnership
 
 Pompeii, Scientific American historical article, 26 May 1877, pp. 326–27

 

Archaeological museums in Italy
Archaeological parks
Mount Vesuvius
Museums in Campania
Museums of ancient Rome in Italy
National museums of Italy
Roman sites of Campania
Ruins in Italy
Tourist attractions in Campania

1748 archaeological discoveries
79 disestablishments
70s disestablishments in the Roman Empire
Destroyed cities
Former populated places in Italy
Human remains (archaeological)
Italic archaeological sites
Metropolitan City of Naples
Osci
Populated places disestablished in the 1st century
Populated places established in the 6th century BC
Populated places established in the 7th century BC
World Heritage Sites in Italy
Natural disaster ghost towns
Archaeological sites in Campania